The following highways are numbered 58:

International
 European route E58

Australia
 Riverina Highway

Canada
 Alberta Highway 58
 Highway 58 (Ontario)
 Saskatchewan Highway 58

Finland
 Finnish national road 58

India
  National Highway 58, (NH 58)

Iran
 Road 58

Italy
 Autostrada A58

Japan
 Japan National Route 58
 Okinawa Expressway
 Naha Airport Expressway

Korea, South
 National Route 58

New Zealand
 New Zealand State Highway 58

Philippines
 N58 highway (Philippines)

United Kingdom
 British A58 (Prescot-Wetherby)
 British M58 (Netherton-Orrel)

United States
 U.S. Route 58
 Alabama State Route 58 (former)
 Arkansas Highway 58
 Arkansas Highway 58E
 California State Route 58
 Colorado State Highway 58
 Connecticut Route 58
 Delaware Route 58
 Georgia State Route 58
 Hawaii Route 58
 Idaho State Highway 58
 Illinois Route 58
 Indiana State Road 58
 Iowa Highway 58
 K-58 (Kansas highway)
 Kentucky Route 58
 Louisiana Highway 58
 Maryland Route 58
 Massachusetts Route 58
 M-58 (Michigan highway)
 Minnesota State Highway 58
 County Road 58 (Ramsey County, Minnesota)
 Missouri Route 58
 Nebraska Highway 58
 Nevada State Route 58 (former)
 New Jersey Route 58 (former)
 New Mexico State Road 58
 New York State Route 58
 County Route 58 (Cattaraugus County, New York)
 County Route 58 (Chautauqua County, New York)
 County Route 58 (Clinton County, New York)
 County Route 58 (Dutchess County, New York)
 County Route 58 (Madison County, New York)
 County Route 58 (Niagara County, New York)
 County Route 58 (Otsego County, New York)
 County Route 58 (Putnam County, New York)
 County Route 58 (Rensselaer County, New York)
 County Route 58 (Saratoga County, New York)
 County Route 58 (St. Lawrence County, New York)
 County Route 58 (Suffolk County, New York)
 County Route 58 (Warren County, New York)
 County Route 58 (Wyoming County, New York)
 North Carolina Highway 58
 North Dakota Highway 58
 Ohio State Route 58
 Oklahoma State Highway 58
 Oklahoma State Highway 58A
 Oregon Route 58
 Pennsylvania Route 58
 South Carolina Highway 58
 Tennessee State Route 58 
 Texas State Highway 58 (former)
 Farm to Market Road 58
 Texas State Highway Spur 58 (former)
 Texas Park Road 58
 Utah State Route 58
 Vermont Route 58
 Virginia State Route 58 (1930-1933) (former)
 West Virginia Route 58
 Wisconsin Highway 58

See also
 A58 (disambiguation)